San Martin is a rural barangay in the Basakan District of Malaybalay, Bukidnon, Philippines. It is bounded to the north by Managok, to the east by Miglamin, to the south by Sinanglanan and Santo Niño, and to the west by Simaya. San Martin is characterized by a flat terrain with a hilly and rugged terrain in its northern and eastern boundary dominated by Mount Capistrano, a popular attraction in the city, shared with Simayà and Managok. It was a sitio of Linabo known as Macatol until 1951 when it became a regular barrio of Malaybalay.

References 

Barangays of Malaybalay